Zophodia multistriatella is a species of snout moth in the genus Zophodia. It was described by André Blanchard and Edward C. Knudson in 1982. It is found in the US states of Texas, Arizona and New Mexico.

The length of the forewings is 11.8-13.5 mm for males and 11.3-12.6 mm for females. The forewings are powdery gray and the hindwings are semitranslucent pale luteous, with darker veins and a darker outer margin.

The larvae probably feed on Opuntia species.

References

Moths described in 1982
Phycitini